Centrum, located in Fort Worden State Park near Port Townsend, Washington, in Jefferson County is a multidisciplinary nonprofit arts organization that presents workshops and performances in a wide variety of artistic disciplines.

Origin
Centrum was founded as a partnership between the Washington State Arts Commission, the Office of the Superintendent of Public Instruction, and the Washington State Parks and Recreation Commission. The first executive director was Joseph F. Wheeler. Early program directors included Bill Ransom and Sam Hamill.

Activities
While most programming is intergenerational, Centrum also provides a series of residential learning experiences that serve youth only. About one-third of Centrum workshop participants are 18 years old or younger. Centrum presents such programs as the Festival of American Fiddle Tunes, Jazz Port Townsend, the Port Townsend Acoustic Blues Festival, and the Port Townsend Writers' Conference.

External links

 Centrum web site
Fort Worden State Park web site

Arts organizations based in Washington (state)
Port Townsend, Washington
Tourist attractions in Jefferson County, Washington